The Indian Journal of Pharmaceutical Education and Research is a quarterly peer-reviewed open-access medical journal covering pharmaceutics, biopharmaceutics, pharmaceutical analysis, pharmacy practice, clinical pharmacy, and pharmacy education. It is published by the Association of Pharmaceutical Teachers of India and the editor-in-chief is M. Ahmed.

Abstracting and indexing
The journal is abstracted and indexed in Chemical Abstracts Service, Embase, Science Citation Index Expanded, and Scopus. According to the Journal Citation Reports, the journal has a 2019 impact factor of 0.501.

References

External links

Creative Commons Attribution-licensed journals
Monthly journals
English-language journals
Pharmacy education
Publications established in 1967
Pharmacology journals
Education journals